Parliamentary elections were held in Greece on 9 April 2000. The ruling PASOK of Prime Minister Costas Simitis was narrowly re-elected, defeating the conservative New Democracy party. Simitis formed his third cabinet.

Results

References

Greece
Parliamentary elections in Greece
2000 in Greek politics
Legislative
Greek